The Battle of Pollilur was fought on 27 August 1781, between forces of the Kingdom of Mysore under Hyder Ali and British East India Company forces led by General Eyre Coote. The battle was fought on the site of a 1780 encounter in which a Company force was almost completely routed or captured.

In the 1781 battle, the company's army was organized into two lines. One line fought against the troops under Tipu Sultan. But Hyder Ali's army faced severe casualties and retreated to Kanchipuram.

After the battle, a shortage of provisions led Coote to move his forces toward Tripassore. Both the sides retreated in a drawn battle and both claimed victory by firing a salute though the English claimed "dubious victory".

Battlefield today 
Much of the battle site has been altered owing to paddy cultivation. Two obelisks stand in memory of two officers who served in the army of East India Company. They stand on a higher ground than the surroundings and the inscribed text is very light and faded. Colonel George Brown and Captain James Hislop are remembered in the obelisks.

The obelisk dedicated to Lieutenant Colonel George Brown bears the following text:

Sacred to the Memory of Lieutenant Colonel George Brown

When Lieutenant of Grenadiers in Draper's Regiment

he lost his Right Arm on the storm of Conjevearam Pagoda occupied by Ye French

on  the 18th of April ???? and fell in a general Action fought on this Field between the English

Forces and the Troops of Hyder Ally??? Bahaduer on the 27th of August 1781

esteemed by every Rank a gallant Soldier, an able Officer, and, an Honest Man.

The second obelisk, in memory of Captain James Hislop, displays the following text:

Sacred to the memory of Captain James Hislop

who was killed by a Cannon Ball from the Enemy near this Spot,

The Field of Battle, 27 August 1781 while serving as Aid de Camp to

Lieut. General Sir Eyre Coote KB. Commander in Chief

------------------

His professional Abilities and private Virtues,

Were felt and acknowledged by all his Contemporaries.

References

Bibliography
 Roy, Kaushik. War, Culture, Society in Early Modern South Asia, 1740-1849. Routledge, 2011.
Vibart, H. M (1881). The military history of the Madras engineers and pioneers, from 1743 up to the present time, Volume 1

Pollilur 1781
Pollilur 1781
Pollilur 1781
1781 in India
Pollilur 1781
History of Tamil Nadu